The Shelton House, also known as the Holliday-Beaufait House, is a historic house in Raymond, Mississippi. It was built in 1830 and designed in the Greek Revival architectural style. It is listed on the National Register of Historic Places.

History
The house was built circa 1830, and remodelled around 1850. It was the home of Judge Shelton during the American Civil War of 1861–1865. In 1919, it was purchased by Thomas Monroe Holliday and his wife, née Lucretia Beaufait. It remained in the Holliday family in the 1980s.

Architectural significance
The house was designed in the Greek Revival architectural style. It has been listed on the National Register of Historic Places since July 15, 1986.

References

Houses on the National Register of Historic Places in Mississippi
National Register of Historic Places in Hinds County, Mississippi
Greek Revival architecture in Mississippi
Houses in Raymond, Mississippi
Houses completed in 1830